Rozema is a Dutch and West Frisian surname.

Notable people with the surname 

 Dave Rozema (born 1956), American former Major League Baseball pitcher
 Irene Rozema, West German sprint canoer
 Mischa Rozema (born 1971), Dutch film and commercials director
 Patricia Rozema (born 1958), Canadian film director, writer and producer
 Sander Rozema (born 1987), Dutch former professional footballer

References 

Surnames of Dutch origin